Jessica Schlegel (born 20 August 2000) is a Canadian-Swiss ice hockey player, currently playing in the Swiss Women's League (SWHL A) with the ZSC Lions Frauen.

She represented  at the 2019 IIHF Women's World Championship. As a junior player with the Swiss national under-18 team, Schlegel participated in the IIHF U18 Women's World Championship in 2015, 2016, 2017, and 2018. At the 2016 Winter Youth Olympics in Lillehammer, she won a bronze medal in the girls' ice hockey tournament with the Swiss under-16 team.

References

External links

2000 births
Living people
Ice hockey people from Zürich
Ice hockey players at the 2016 Winter Youth Olympics
Swiss women's ice hockey forwards
Swiss Women's League players
Youth Olympic bronze medalists for Switzerland